Kev Brown is an American music producer and artist. He is the founding member of the former Low Budget Crew

References

External links
 Kev Brown's Bandcamp
 Kev Brown discography at Discogs
 

American hip hop record producers
People from Landover, Maryland
Living people
Year of birth missing (living people)